Oasis Skyway Garden Hotel is a skyscraper located at 15 Dapu Road, Luwan, Shanghai, 200023, China. It is 226 m high, has 52 stories and was completed in 2007. It contains 454 hotel rooms and 239 serviced apartments. It is now home to the Pullman Shanghai Skyway Hotel.

See also
 List of tallest buildings in Shanghai

External links
 
 

Hotel buildings completed in 2007
Skyscrapers in Shanghai
Residential skyscrapers in China
Skyscraper hotels in Shanghai
Pullman Hotels and Resorts